An institution of innovative development and excellence, committed to realize human potential through holistic education.

Ramon Magsaysay Memorial Colleges (RMMC) a privately owned, non-sectarian higher educational institution in General Santos, Philippines that has been serving the community of the SOCKSARGEN region, the nearby provinces, and the whole of Mindanao.

It is the first and only institution in Region XII to have programs accredited by the Philippine Association of Colleges and Universities (PACUCOA).

The college is awarded International Organization Standardization (ISO) 9001:2008 and 9001:2015.

History 
Founded in 1957 by the late Attorney Eugenio Millado and his wife, Mrs. Aurora Garcia-Millado, as Mindanao Vocational School (MVS). In 1961, MVS earned its college status and became Magsaysay Memorial Colleges (MMC). For the next few years, MMC added more undergraduate programs, opened departments in kindergarten, elementary education, secondary education and later acquired Southern Island Colleges (SIC).

In 1978, the late Honorable Florante Garcia-Millado, the only son of Attorney Eugenio Millado and Mrs. Aurora Garcia-Millado, became the college president. The school was renamed again in honor of the 7th President of the Philippines, Ramon Magsaysay. 

Since 1993, Ramon Magsaysay Memorial Colleges (RMMC) has been succeeded by the wife of the Honorable Florante Garcia-Millado, Mrs. Regner-Millado, as the appointee Chair of the Board, alongside their four children as the appointed members of the board and corporate executive positions.

Seal 
The Seal of the Ramon Magsaysay Memorial Colleges shall consist of two concentric rings within which shall be inscribed "Ramon Magsaysay Memorial Colleges".

Motto 
Passion for Excellence. Commitment to Service.

Sister Company 
Ramon Magsaysay Memorial Colleges - Marbel (RMMC-MI) started its operations in 2008 in Koronadal.

Academic Programs

Accreditations and Affiliations 
Programs accredited by the Philippine Association of Colleges and Universities (PACUCOA):
 Level III for Bachelor of Elementary Education and Secondary Education
 Level II for Master of Arts (MA) in Education, Bachelor of Arts, Bachelor in Business Administration, Bachelor in Criminology, Bachelor in Information Technology, Bachelor in Office Administration, Bachelor in Computer Science, Bachelor in Accountancy, High School
In addition, the school is recognized by the Department of Education (DepEd) Philippines and the Commission on Higher Education (CHED) Philippines, also a Technical Education and Skills Development Authority (TESDA) accredited training center.

International Partnerships 
The Philippine Consulate General in Dubai and the Northern Emirates witnessed the signing between Ramon Magsasay Memorial Colleges (RMMC) and the aforementioned institutions:
 Skyline University College of Sharjah, under the patronage of its ruler His Highness Sheikh Sultan bin Muhammad Al-Qasimi.
 Bath Spa University of Ras Al Khaimah, under the chairmanship of His Highness Sheikh Dr. Majid bin Saeed Al Nuaimi.
 Al Alfiah Filipino Private School of Sharjah, a Filipino focused educational institution in the United Arab Emirates.
 IPE Management School Paris or the Institut pour l'Expertise, a European business school. IPE Paris is one of the six grandes ècoles within Le Réseau des Grandes Ècoles Spécialisées (Réseau GES).
 Dusit Thani Dubai, a 5-star luxury hotel on Sheikh Zayed Road in the heart of Dubai's financial district.

References

External links 
 Ramon Magsaysay Memorial Colleges (RMMC-GSC)
 Ramon Magsaysay Memorial Colleges - Marbel (RMMC-MI)

Private universities and colleges in the Philippines
Educational institutions established in 1960
Educational institutions established in 2008
Universities and colleges in General Santos